Markus Rickert (born 18 February 1984) is a German footballer who plays as a goalkeeper.

References

External links

1984 births
Living people
German footballers
Germany youth international footballers
FC Hansa Rostock players
Kickers Emden players
TuS Koblenz players
SV Wilhelmshaven players
Sportfreunde Lotte players
FC Rot-Weiß Erfurt players
VfL Osnabrück players
2. Bundesliga players
3. Liga players
Association football goalkeepers
VSG Altglienicke players
FC Viktoria 1889 Berlin players
Sportspeople from Rostock